Isaiah 55 is the fifty-fifth chapter of the Book of Isaiah in the Hebrew Bible or the Old Testament of the Christian Bible. This book contains the prophecies attributed to the prophet Isaiah, and is one of the Books of the Prophets. Chapters 40-55 are known as "Deutero-Isaiah" and date from the time of the Israelites' exile in Babylon.

Text 
The original text was written in Hebrew language. This chapter is divided into 13 verses.

Textual witnesses
Some early manuscripts containing the text of this chapter in Hebrew are of the Masoretic Text tradition, which includes the Codex Cairensis (895), the Petersburg Codex of the Prophets (916), Aleppo Codex (10th century), Codex Leningradensis (1008).

Fragments containing parts of this chapter were found among the Dead Sea Scrolls (3rd century BC or later):
 1QIsaa: complete
 1QIsab: extant: verses 2‑13
 4QIsac (4Q57): extant: verses 1‑6

There is also a translation into Koine Greek known as the Septuagint, made in the last few centuries BCE. Extant ancient manuscripts of the Septuagint version include Codex Vaticanus (B; B; 4th century), Codex Sinaiticus (S; BHK: S; 4th century), Codex Alexandrinus (A; A; 5th century) and Codex Marchalianus (Q; Q; 6th century).

Parashot
The parashah sections listed here are based on the Aleppo Codex. Isaiah 55 is a part of the Consolations (Isaiah 40–66). {P}: open parashah; {S}: closed parashah.
 {S} 55:1–5 {S} 55:6–13 {P}

The Lord's invitation (55:1&3)

Verse 1
 Ho, every one that thirsteth, come ye to the waters, 
 and he that hath no money; come ye, buy, and eat;
 yea, come, buy wine and milk without money and without price.
In the Septuagint, the invitation reads:
Go to the water, ... go and buy.

Verse 3
 Incline your ear, and come unto me: 
 hear, and your soul shall live; 
 and I will make an everlasting covenant with you,
 even the sure mercies of David.
This passage is cited by the Apostle Paul in a synagogue in Antioch, Pisidia, as recorded in Acts 13:34.

God's words are powerful (55:8–11)

Verse 8
 For my thoughts are not your thoughts,
 neither are your ways my ways,
 saith the Lord.

Verse 9
 For as the heavens are higher than the earth,
 so are my ways higher than your ways,
 and my thoughts than your thoughts.
Anglican bishop Robert Lowth argues that the comparative "higher" is an incorrect translation here, stating this verse instead as:
For as the heavens are high above the earth,

Verses 10–11
For as the rain comes down, and the snow from heaven,
and do not return there but water the earth and make it bring forth and bud
that it may give seed to the sower and bread to the eater,
so shall My word be that goes forth from My mouth;it shall not return to Me void, but it shall accomplish that which I please,and it shall prosper in the thing for which I sent it.''
The theme of verses 10 and 11 is closely comparable to Isaiah 40:8, and together form an 'inclusio', bracketing the section comprising chapters 40–55, as 'the end matching the beginning'.

God's people will celebrate (55:12–13)
"Paradise regained" is a recurring theme in the book of Isaiah, that after the transformation of animal life in Isaiah 11:6–9, the plant life is here transformed from the 'briers and thorns' as threats to agriculture in Isaiah 5:6 and others, to be cypress and myrtle (cf. Isaiah 41:19) in praise of God.

See also

David
Related Bible parts: Isaiah 63, Matthew 5, John 7, Acts 13

References

Sources

External links

Jewish
Isaiah 55 Hebrew with Parallel English

Christian
Isaiah 55 English Translation with Parallel Latin Vulgate

55